José Mauricio Larriera Dibarboure (born 26 August 1970) is a Uruguayan football manager and former player who played as a right back.

Career
Larriera started his managerial career with Club Sol de América. After that, he coached Racing Club de Montevideo, Defensor Sporting, Al-Wakrah SC, Godoy Cruz Antonio Tomba, O'Higgins, Danubio, Montevideo Wanderers, and Club Atletico Peñarol where he now coaches.

References 

1970 births
Living people
People from Florida Department
Uruguayan footballers
Association football defenders
Liverpool F.C. (Montevideo) players
C.A. Rentistas players
Miramar Misiones players
Deportivo Maldonado players
Racing Club de Montevideo players
El Tanque Sisley players
Uruguayan football managers
Uruguayan Primera División managers
El Tanque Sisley managers
Club Sol de América managers
Racing Club de Montevideo managers
Defensor Sporting managers
Al-Wakrah SC managers
Godoy Cruz Antonio Tomba managers
O'Higgins F.C. managers
Danubio F.C. managers
Montevideo Wanderers managers
Peñarol managers
Uruguayan expatriate football managers
Uruguayan expatriate sportspeople in Peru
Uruguayan expatriate sportspeople in Chile
Uruguayan expatriate sportspeople in Paraguay
Uruguayan expatriate sportspeople in Qatar
Uruguayan expatriate sportspeople in Argentina
Expatriate football managers in Paraguay
Expatriate football managers in Qatar
Expatriate football managers in Argentina
Expatriate football managers in Chile